BBC Spotlight is the BBC's regional TV news programme for the South West of England, covering Cornwall, Devon, Isles of Scilly, southern and western Somerset, western Dorset and the Channel Islands. There is also a special version of the programme for viewers in the Channel Islands. It launched on 20 April 1961. The main version of the programme broadcasts between 18:30 and 19:00 on weekdays, with shorter bulletins at other times. The programme can be viewed anywhere in the UK (and Europe) on Sky channel 967/968 on the BBC UK regional TV on satellite service. Its main competitors are ITV West Country's main evening programme ITV News West Country in Cornwall, Devon, Isles of Scilly, southern and western Somerset and western Dorset; and ITV Channel Television's main evening programme ITV News Channel TV in the Channel Islands.

BBC Spotlight broadcasts from the BBC Broadcasting House in Seymour Road, Plymouth, the headquarters of BBC South West. There are smaller studios in Exeter and Truro.

History
Although local radio had been broadcast from Plymouth as station 2PY between 1924 and 1934, the first regional television programme was not broadcast until 20 April 1961, just nine days before the rival ITV service from Westward Television began broadcasting. At first a ten-minute bulletin called News from the South West was read by Tom Salmon, but in under a year it had doubled in length and had been renamed as South West at Six, hosted by Sheila Tracy. The name BBC Spotlight was adopted on 30 September 1963.

Those early radio broadcasts had been made from the Athenaeum Chambers in Athenaeum Lane in Plymouth (next to what became Westward and TSW's headquarters), but just before the Second World War the BBC started looking for alternative premises. A Victorian villa named Ingledene in Seymour Road was bought from the Douglass family and this building has, as of 2012, remained the BBC's headquarters in the South West. It has been considerably extended over the years, including the addition of a new and larger television studio in 1974 in preparation for the conversion of BBC Spotlight to colour the following year. A replacement purpose-built broadcasting centre on the opposite side of Sutton Harbour from the Barbican has been under construction since 2008 and was due to open in mid-2011, though it has since stalled due to the effect of the recession on the construction industry and a change in the original plans. In late 2012, the owner of the harbour expressed fears the move may never happen and admitted other parties had expressed an interest in moving to the site earmarked for the BBC. In 2013, the BBC confirmed that it was not moving to Sutton Harbour, and instead was refurbishing its existing Plymouth headquarters.

A lighthouse motif has been in use within the programme's title sequences for many years until May 2000, when BBC Spotlight adopted the generic BBC regional news design. The motif returned in May 2006, and the use of a lighthouse in the titles continued until the latest relaunch in June 2015.

Presenters

Victoria Graham presents the 6.30pm programme. Another longstanding presenter is Natalie Cornah, who also presents the main programme.

News
 Victoria Graham
 Natalie Cornah

Channel Islands- Alison Moss

Weather
 David Braine
 Emily Wood

Former on-air team members

 Kally Adderkin-Hall
 Kate Adie
 Fern Britton
 Amy Cole
 Jill Dando (deceased)
 Chris Denham
 Teresa Driscoll
 Dave Gibbins
 Simon Hall
 Will Hanrahan

 Jon Kay
 Sue King
 Russell Labey
 Justin Leigh 
 Sue Lawley
 Carole Madge
 Hamish Marshall 
 Gillian Miles
 Juliet Morris
 Kawser Quamer (weather presenter)
 Craig Rich (weather presenter)

 Angela Rippon
 Hugh Scully (deceased)
 Christopher Slade
 Sheila Tracy (deceased)

BBC Channel Islands
BBC Channel Islands is the dedicated opt-out service for the Channel Islands.

Local news broadcasts for the Islands began in the 1990s, when a short bulletin aired following the BBC Nine O'Clock News. Since October 2000, two evening bulletins have been broadcast at 6:30pm and 10:30pm. Originally broadcast from a studio at the Fremont Point transmitter, the news service is now entirely based at the studios of BBC Radio Jersey in St Helier.

The opt-outs are usually presented by Charlie McArdle and produced by a team of multi-skilling journalists who write, film and edit their own stories, as well as producing and directing the bulletins on weekdays. The main opt takes up the first 12 minutes of the nightly 6:30pm programme with a full opt at 10:30pm. No opt-outs are broadcast during the day and at weekends, except for special occasions such as local elections or major sporting events such as the Island Games.

Like other BBC enterprises in the Channel Islands, funding comes primarily from television licence fees collected within the Islands.

References

External links
 
 

1961 British television series debuts
1960s British television series
1970s British television series
1980s British television series
1990s British television series
2000s British television series
2010s British television series
2020s British television series
BBC Regional News shows
Mass media in Cornwall
Mass media in Dorset
Mass media in Jersey
Television news in England
Television news in Jersey
Television news in Guernsey
Television news program articles using incorrect naming style